NBA 07 is a basketball video game which was released on September 26, 2006. It is the second installment of the NBA series by Sony Computer Entertainment, and the first one for the PlayStation 3.  It was one of three PlayStation 3 titles released at launch (Marvel: Ultimate Alliance and Ridge Racer 7) that supported the 1080p high definition video output. Kobe Bryant of the Los Angeles Lakers served as the cover athlete.

Gameplay
On all consoles, the game uses graphics from TNT's NBA coverage.

Reception

NBA 07 received "mixed or average reviews" according to Metacritic. In Japan, where the PlayStation 3 version was ported for release on January 11, 2007, Famitsu gave it a score of 26 out of 40.

Awards
AIAS Nominations (10th Annual Interactive Achievement Awards): Best Sports Game of 2006

References

External links

2006 video games
National Basketball Association video games
PlayStation 2 games
PlayStation 3 games
PlayStation Portable games
Sony Interactive Entertainment games
North America-exclusive video games
Video games developed in the United States
San Diego Studio games
Multiplayer and single-player video games